

Notable Ska Jazz Musicians and Musical Acts 
The Skatalites
Tommy McCook, w/The Supersonics, w/The Aggravators
Roland Alphonso
Don Drummond
Ernest Ranglin
Jackie Mittoo
The Rocksteady 7
New York Ska-Jazz Ensemble
El Pussycat Ska
Dougie Dockerino

References